Randonneuring (also known as Audax in the UK, Australia and Brazil) is a long-distance cycling sport with its origins in audax cycling. In randonneuring, riders attempt courses of 200 km or more, passing through predetermined "controls" (checkpoints) every few tens of kilometres. Riders aim to complete the course within specified time limits, and receive equal recognition regardless of their finishing order. Riders may travel in groups or alone as they wish, and are expected to be self-sufficient between controls. A randonneuring event is called a randonnée or brevet, and a rider who has completed a 200 km event is called a randonneur.
The international governing body for randonneuring is Audax Club Parisien (ACP), which works with other randonneuring organisations worldwide through Les Randonneurs Mondiaux (RM). Randonneuring is popular in France, and has a following in The Netherlands, Belgium, United Kingdom, Italy, Australia, United States, Canada, Brazil, Ireland, India, Indonesia, Korea, Japan and Malaysia.

History
In the late nineteenth century Italy, day-long "challenge" sports became popular. Participants aimed to cover as much distance as possible and prove themselves audax ("audacious"). Similar events became popular elsewhere, and in 1904 French journalist Henri Desgrange produced Audax regulations, which belonged to his Auto newspaper. Under the Audax regulations, riders rode as a group. Successful riders were awarded a certificate called a Brevet d'Audax. A group of successful audax cyclists formed the Audax Club Parisien (ACP), which took over the organisation of Audax events on Desgrange's behalf. In 1920, there was a disagreement between Desgrange and the ACP. Desgrange withdrew ACP's permission to organise events under his Audax regulations, and ACP created its own allure libre (free-paced) version of the sport, where successful riders were awarded certificates called Brevets des Randonneurs. This style is now popularly known as "randonneuring".

Desgrange continued to promote the original Audax rules, and on July 14, 1921 the Union of Parisian Audax Cyclistes (UACP) was formed, which became the Union of French Audax in January 1956, and later simply Union des Audax. The original style is still popular in France and neighbouring countries. In Great Britain, where the original audax style does not exist, and in Brazil, where it is not common, the term audax is used interchangeably with randonneuring, reflecting the sport's origins with Audax Club Parisien.

Randonneuring has much in common with cyclotouring, the founding-father of which is often said to be the journalist Velocio (Paul de Vivie), also credited with making derailleur gears popular.

Rules and process

The majority of randonneuring events are classified as "brevets des randonneurs". In such events, riders follow a course through a series of predetermined checkpoints called "controls"; these are typically a few tens of kilometres apart. Each rider carries a "brevet card" which must be stamped at each control to prove completion. In some events, riders will be asked to supplement this by collecting till receipts in certain places and by answering questions about their surroundings at "information controls", such as recording a distance from a milepost. At the end of the event, the brevet card is handed in to the organisers who will then check and certify the results. Riders are expected to keep within minimum and maximum average speed limits. Riders who arrive early at controls will be made to wait before they can carry on. Riders can stop to eat and rest at controls, though no extra time is allowed for doing so. Riders are free to ride individually or in groups as they wish. A brevet is not a race, and no completion order is published. Riders are expected to be fully self-sufficient between controls and must carry food, water, spare clothing and tools to meet their requirements.

In addition to brevets appearing on a calendar date, there are "permanent" (or "raid") brevets which may be ridden on any date by prior arrangement with the organiser, and "DIY permanents" where a rider proposes a specific route. In these events, the "controls" are predesignated places where a rider will stop and collect evidence of passage such as a shop receipt.

These will typically involve an element of night-riding. These brevets are seen as a good introduction to the full-blown "randonneur" events, and also as a manageable distance for riders who want to maintain regular participation in the sport over a sustained period of time.

Bicycles and equipment

Any type of bicycle is acceptable for randonneuring, with the only stipulation being that the bicycle must be powered solely by the human rider. Tricycles and recumbents, therefore, are allowed.

Authors such as Simon Doughty describe a 'typical' randonneuring bike as being somewhere between a dedicated road-racing bike and a touring bike. Such bicycles usually have lightweight steel frames, drop handlebars, relaxed (i.e. comfortable) frame geometry, medium-width tyres, triple chainsets, moderately low gearing, and the capacity to carry lightweight luggage. Mudguards and lighting systems are also common, and may be required for some events.

As of 2019, modern lighting (LED & Lithium Ion batteries), paired with a dynamo hubs are more prevalent; as well as a mix between equipment designed for bikepacking (aerodynamic, lightweight); or more traditional pannier systems particularly for longer distance events.

Randonneurs are expected to be self-sufficient between controls except in the event of real emergency. Riders are therefore expected to carry food, water, tools, etc. Some events require riders to carry specific equipment (e.g. lights, spare bulbs, reflective clothing), though this varies depending on the organiser.

Famous brevets
The majority of brevets are relatively small and locally organised, making for a busy calendar of events for enthusiasts. However, there are also some particularly well-known and prestigious events which attract participants from all over the world.

Paris–Brest–Paris
Sometimes regarded as the Blue Riband randonnée, Paris–Brest–Paris (PBP) is an approximately  event held on an out-and-back course between Paris and Brest every four years. Begun in 1891, it is the oldest bicycling event still regularly run. It began as a race for professional cyclists, but is now a non-competitive endurance challenge. To qualify, a cyclist must complete a series of brevets within the same year. The series can be completed in any order ( is traditional), and any brevet may be replaced with a longer randonnée.

The PBP was the first popular long distance race, initiated in 1891. After 1931 the riders were separated into three groups: professional cyclists, and two non-professional groups known as the Allure libre club and the Audax club. Allure Libre consisted of individuals riding alone in the spirit of self-sufficiency, while Audax riders rode as a group and maintained a steady pace. As interest in long distance racing had waned in favour of stage events like the Tour de France, the professional race part of the PBP was lost in 1951, leaving only the randonneuring part of the event.

The Randonneuring part of the PBP had been governed by Audax Club Parisien (ACP) since the 1930s. In 1975 the Audax and Allure libre groups split up and formed two different PBP events. Now the ACP runs the event every four years in their Allure Libre format, and the Union des Audax runs it every five years in their Audax format.

The most recent Paris-Brest-Paris was held in 2019 on August 18. In order to qualify for the event a randonneur needed to do a super randonnee series of brevets in the qualifying year i.e. by July 2019.

London–Edinburgh–London
London–Edinburgh–London is a 1500 km event that takes place in the United Kingdom every four years. The event typically starts in north London, taking a route through the east of England, to Edinburgh, usually returning along the same route.

The event last took place in August 2022.

Boston–Montreal–Boston
Boston–Montreal–Boston (BMB) is also a  out-and-back between Boston and Montreal. BMB is sometimes regarded as the North American equivalent of PBP. It was held every year except when Paris–Brest–Paris was held.

Other 1000 Km Brevets

Canada 
 Riding Mountain 1000

India 
 Kittur Express 1000 km (Bangalore)
 Jog Falls 1000 km (Bangalore)
 Noida Dasuya Noida 1000 km (Noida)
 Deccan Queen 1000 km (Pune)
 Brevet LOC
 TN 1000
 BRM Ek Hazaar (Lucknow)

Ireland 
 Celtic Knot 1000 km (Offaly)

Other 1200 km brevets

Australia 

 Great Southern Randonnee 1200

 Perth–Albany–Perth (Australia) 1200 km
 Sydney-Melbourne (Australia) 1200 km

Canada 

Granite Anvil 1200
Rocky Mountain 1200
VanIsle 1200 (Canada)

India 
 Bangalore–Goa–Bangalore (BGB) 1200 (Bangalore)
 Bliss In The Hills 1200 (Bangalore)
 Gates of Heaven 1200 (Bangalore)
 Goa 2 Kanyakumari 1200 km
 Kochi–Bangalore–Kochi - Psyclepath 1200
 KODANAD – 1200 km
 Mahro Rajasthan 1200 (Delhi)
 Mumbai–Indore–Mumbai 1200
 Mumbai-Mahabaleshwar-Mumbai-Dhule-Mumbai 1200 (Mumbai)
 Jammu Express 1200 km Noida–Jammu–Noida (Noida)
 Ranbanka Ride 1200
 Rivers–Mountains–Beaches 1200
 Tapi to Aravalli 1200 km

USA 
 Big Wild Ride 1200 km (Alaska)
 Cascade 1200 km (USA)
 Colorado High Country 1200 km Randonnée

 Coulee Challenge 1200 Brevet (Minnesota/Wisconsin)
 Gold Rush Randonnée 1200 km
 Last Chance 1200 km Randonnée
 Taste of Carolina 1200 km
 Texas Rando Stampede 1200 km

Russia 

1200 Chuiski tract
 Trans Oural
 Vologda–Onega–Ladoga 1200 km

Other countries 

 Big Tour of Bavaria 1200 (Germany)

 BRM Tour of Hungary 1200 (Hungary)
 Herentals – Cosne s/Loire – Herentals 1200 (Belgium)
 Israel 1200 km (Israel)
 Korea Grande Randonnee 1200 (Korea)
 Lowlands 1200 km (Netherlands)
 Lviv–Karpaty–Lviv, 1200 km (Ukraine)
 Madrid–Gijon–Madrid 1200 km (Spain)
 Míle Fáilte 1200 (Ireland)
 Hokkaido 1200 km (Japan)
 Silk Route (Uzbekistan) 1200 km
 Södertälje–Falkenberg–Södertälje 1200 km (Sweden)
 Sofia–Varna–Sofia 1200 km (Bulgaria)
 Super Brevet Scandinavia 1200 km (Denmark, Norway, Sweden)

Other 1400 km brevets 
 4 Corners of Croatia 1450 km (Croatia)
 Bangkok–Phrae–Bangkok 1400 km (Thailand)
 BHARD Brevet (Bosnia and Herzegovina)
 Dalhousie 1400 km (Noida Randonneurs) (India)
 Danube Road Randonneur 1440 km (Romania)
 Dutch Capitals Tour 1400 km (Netherlands)
 Giro Central Greece 1400 km (Greece)

Other 1400 plus km brevets 
 1001 Miglia 1630 km (Italy)
 Berlin-Munich-Berlin 1500 km (Germany)
 Bristol-Glasgow-Bristol 1600km (United Kingdom)
 Hamburg–Berlin–Cologne–Hamburg 1500 km (Germany)
 Maraton Rowerowy Dookoła Polski 3130 km (Poland)
 Sverigetempot 2100 km (Sweden)
 Tour Aotearoa 3000 km (New Zealand)
 Ultimate Island Explorer 2000 km (Canada)
 Uppsala–Trondheim–Uppsala 1500 km (Sweden & Norway)
 Wild Atlantic Way 2100 km (Ireland)

Awards

A rider who has successfully completed a  brevet in limited time is called a randonneur. This is a lifelong title.

Riders completing successful events receive awards, either from Audax Club Parisien or another randonneuring organisation. Examples of these are:

 Super Randonneurfor completing a series of  brevets within the same season.
 Randonneur 5000for completing the full series of  brevets, the Paris–Brest–Paris and a Flèche Vélocio (in which at least three riders must start, and at least three must finish). Other BRM, LRM, or ACP homologated events up to a balance of 5000 km total, all within 4 years.
 Randonneur 10000for completing two full series of  brevets, the Paris–Brest–Paris, another 1200 km event homologated by LRM, a Flèche Vélocio (in which at least three riders must start, and at least three must finish), and a 1 Super Randonnee (a permanent of 600 km and at least 10,000 m (32.800 ft) of climbing, within a 60-hour time limit, homologated by the Audax Club Parisien). Other BRM, LRM, or ACP homologated events up to a balance of 10000 km total, all within 4 years.
 Paris–Brest–Parisfor completion of the PBP within the 90-hour time.
 Many othersfor example, BMB, RUSA specific Super Randonneur.

Time limits
Randonneuring events must be undertaken within set time limits based on a set average speed. There is some regional variation in these, but the following list is typical:
13.5 hours (15 km/h)
20 hours (15 km/h)
27 hours (15 km/h)
40 hours (15 km/h)
75 hours (13.3 km/h)
90 hours (13.3 km/h)
116:40 hours (12 km/h)
220 hours (10 km/h)

Organisers are usually free to reduce the maximum speed. This sometimes makes it easier to man controls at particularly hilly events.
To emphasise that Randonneuring events are not a race, many events also have a maximum speed equal to double the minimum speed (i.e. 30 km/h for a 600 km event).

See also
Challenge riding
Cyclosportive
Race Across America
Reliability trial

References

Cycle sport
Ultra-distance cycling